In many European countries, there are various traditions surrounding the use of bread during the Easter holidays. Traditionally the practice of eating Easter bread or sweetened "communion" bread traces its origin back to Byzantium and the Orthodox Christian church. The recipe for sweetened or "honey-leavened" bread may date back as far as the Homeric Greek period based on anecdotal evidence from classical texts that mention this type of special food. It is also widely known that sweetened bread desserts similar to panettone were a Roman favorite.

Bulgaria, Russia, Belarus, Ukraine, Romania, Poland

Kozunak, kulich, and paska
A Kozunak is the traditional Easter bread in Bulgaria, kulich is one of different traditional Russian paska Easter breads. Kolach is a traditional Czech bread made at Christmas in the shape of a ring. Usually, three rings are stack on top of each other to represent the Holy Trinity. Ukrainian Easter breads are also called paska,  where often a rich, white bread is served and decorated on the top with symbols, including crosses, flowers, braids, wheat, or other designs representing aspects of Orthodox and Eastern Catholic faith.

Romania and Moldova also have a traditional Easter pastry called Pască (The term Pasca is "Easter" in the Eastern Orthodox faith, similar to Pâques in French. It is derived from the Hebrew pesah). The Romanian Pască is made with cheese (and may also include fruits, nuts, or chocolate for decoration). It is usually found alongside another traditional sweet bread which Romanians make for Easter and Christmas called Cozonac.

Baba

Baba or babka is also a Ukrainian, Polish and Belarusian  bread also made at Easter (not to be confused with the Polish Jewish babka bread). Rather than being broad and round, like paska, babka typically is tall and cylindrical, often baked in bundt-type pan. It frequently contains raisins, succade, or orangeat, and may be iced on top. It is much sweeter than paska. Babka usually is only made, like paska, to celebrate Easter Sunday and the rising of Christ.

Syrnyk
Syrnyk is a quickbread with cheese (similar to a cheesecake) that in Russian Orthodox culture is often included in Easter food baskets which are taken to church to be blessed on Easter along with ham, sausages, relishes, chocolate, cheeses and other foods that were forbidden during Great Lent.  The quickbread dough is made with eggs and butter, cottage cheese, cream cheese, honey, walnuts, almonds, candied orange peel, cream and cinnamon.

Germany

During the weeks before Easter, special Easter bread is sold (in German: Osterbrot). This is made with yeast dough, raisins, and almond splinters. Usually, it is cut in slices and spread with butter. People enjoy it either for breakfast or for tea time (in German: Kaffee und Kuchen, literally ″coffee and cake″).

Netherlands

The Dutch Easter bread is the so-called 'stol', a fruit bread with raisins and usually filled with almond paste. It is the same type of bread also eaten as a Christmas bread.

Italy

Central Italy
The pizza di Pasqua ("Easter Pizza" in English) is a leavened savory cake typical of some areas central Italy, based on wheat flour, eggs, pecorino and parmesan, traditionally served at breakfast on Easter morning, or as an appetizer during Easter lunch, accompanied by blessed boiled eggs, ciauscolo and red wine  or, again, served at the Easter Monday picnic. Having the same shape as panettone, the pizza di pasqua with cheese is a typical product of the Marche region, but also Umbrian (where, as a traditional food product, it obtained the P.A.T. recognition). There is also a sweet variant, with candied fruits or without, sugar and a fiocca, that is a meringue glaze with sugar beads.
According to religious tradition, the pizza di pasqua should be prepared on Maundy Thursday or Good Friday to be eaten only at Easter, that is, at the end of the period of fasting and abstinence dictated by lent. Once ready, then, it was customary to bring the pizza di pasqua to the church, so that it would be blessed together with the other foods to be consumed on Easter day.

Sardinia
In Sardinia, Italy, bread is a part of a wide social context. It is the most important food in Sardinia, as well as all over Italy and the Mediterranean. "Bread is a nexus of economic, political, aesthetic, social, symbolic, and health concerns". Bread is symbolic for life. A peasant proverb mentions, "Chie hat pane mai non morit — one who has bread never dies". The Easter holiday is one where bread brings itself into the symbolic realm. Bread is significant for religious purposes. Luisa Fois described bread in her life after she was married and for the Easter holiday. The bread was made into a cross to represent the crucifixion of Jesus Christ. Since they were married, they needed to eat it together. They would share their lives now,  and they must share their "cross" together (their life's burden) as well. "Bread was a product of their union, and its shared consumption reaffirmed their interdependence". From this we gather that bread also displays a message, rather than being an item purely for consumption and nutritional purposes. Two kinds of Easter bread are described in Counihans article. One contained two points, and an egg covered with a cross. "The egg and the points that recall birds in flight speak of fertility, sexuality, and procreation — basic themes in Easter and its pagan precursors". The second bread was designed to have no overall shape, but was rather baked to encircle an egg, with the initials BP put on it. The initials BP stand for buona Pasqua or "happy Easter". "Letters rather than forms express meaning. Letters are symbolic of civilization and ... meaning".

Types

References

External links

Breads for Christ: European Easter Breads Shaped for the Season 
Easter bread recipe
A 2009 article about the origin of chocolate babka. Ari Weinzweig, "Babka, Trans-Atlantic Jewish Delight" The Atlantic. April 30, 2009

 
Breads
Cuisine of Sardinia
German cuisine
North German cuisine
Schleswig-Holstein cuisine
Slavic cuisine
European cuisine